Integrin alpha-11 is a protein that, in humans, is encoded by the ITGA11 gene.

This gene encodes an alpha integrin. Integrins are heterodimeric integral membrane proteins composed of an alpha chain and a beta chain. This protein contains an I domain, is expressed in muscle tissue, dimerizes with beta 1 integrin in vitro, and appears to bind collagen in this form. Therefore, the protein may be involved in attaching muscle tissue to the extracellular matrix. Alternative transcriptional splice variants have been found for this gene, but their biological validity is not determined.

According to one study, ITGA11 expression is increased in the anterior stroma of corneal buttons excised from the eyes affected by keratoconus.

References

Further reading

External links
ITGA11 Info with links in the Cell Migration Gateway 

Integrins